Anders Giske (born 22 November 1959 in Kristiansund) is a retired Norwegian football player.  He is the father of Madeleine Giske. He became the athletic director in Sogndal in 2005 after working in SK Brann.

Honours
 DFB-Pokal finalist: 1990–91
 Bundesliga runner-up: 1989–90

References

External links
 
 

1959 births
Living people
Sportspeople from Kristiansund
Norwegian footballers
Norway international footballers
SK Brann players
Lillestrøm SK players
1. FC Nürnberg players
Bayer 04 Leverkusen players
1. FC Köln players
Bundesliga players
Association football defenders
Norwegian expatriate sportspeople in Germany
Norwegian expatriate footballers
Expatriate footballers in Germany